The Haunted Castle is a silent mystery film directed by Friedrich Wilhelm Murnau.

Plot summary 
A company of men meet for a hunt lasting several days at Castle Vogelöd, being hosted by Lord von Vogelschrey. Because of the rain they spend their time inside. An uninvited guest shows up: Count Johann Oetsch. He's suspected of having shot his brother Peter a few years ago. This rumour gets nourished by a retired Judge of the District Court. The widow of the murder victim also arrives, along with her new husband, Baron Safferstätt. Another guest is announced: Father Faramund, a friend of the deceased husband.

In the following days, Count Oetsch and the Baroness accuse one another of the murder. Flashbacks show that the Baroness' marriage wasn't harmonious. Her first husband became obsessed by spiritualism. She wished for something evil to happen to him, and their guest Baron Safferstätt shot him. She married the Baron, but they felt empty.

Father Faramund takes his false beard and his wig off, revealing himself as Count Oetsch, who now can justify his innocence. Baron Safferstätt shoots himself. The true Father Faramund comes to the castle.

Cast 
Cast adapted from Filmportal.de.

Production and style
The Haunted Castle was adapted from a novel that Murnau biographer described as "semi-highbrow, semi-commercial" story by Rudolf Stratz published in Berliner Illustrirte Zeitung.  
For The Haunted Castle, director F.W. Murnau often wrote in his script when and where scenes were shot. According to details given in the script owned by Robert Plumpe Murnau, Schloß Vogelöd was shot between February 10 and March 2, 1921 with two days were taken just building sets.

Eisner noted the film is sometimes incorrectly described as a horror film, finding it influenced by Swedish films. A reviewer in Sight & Sound described it as "a drawing-room whodunit." Philp Kemp echoed this statement, calling it "not a supernatural story but a murder mystery."

Release
The film premiered in Berlin at the Marmorhaus on April 7, 1921. It is one of the earliest known surviving films of Murnau. The film has been released on DVD and Blu-ray as The Haunted Castle.

Reception
From contemporary reviews in Germany, Alfred Rosenthal reviewed the film in Deutsche Lichtspiel-Zeitung stating gave a positive review of the film stating it would fill cinemas. Another review in Der Kinematograph praised Murnau stating that he "succeeded in expressing the spiritual and avoiding external sensations." and that the cast was "excellent" specifically noting Lothar Mehnert as Count Oetsch.

From retrospective reviews, a reviewer in Sight & Sound stated that "no one is ever going to rank this a major Murnau, but his oldest surviving film is worth watching for signs of his still-evolving language" noting the use of flashbacks, comedy elements. The reviewer also noted the appearance of Olga Tschechowa as a highlight as it was "a decade before she became one of the Third Reich's biggest stars." Kemp gave a lukewarm review finding the plot as"conventional enough, but Murnau's inventive use of space is already evident."

References

Sources

External links 

1921 films
1921 mystery films
German black-and-white films
German silent feature films
Films of the Weimar Republic
Films directed by F. W. Murnau
Films with screenplays by Carl Mayer
Films produced by Erich Pommer
German mystery films
Films set in castles
Silent mystery films
1920s German films